Pulie Badze Wildlife Sanctuary is located in Kohima District of Nagaland. It was first designated as a protected area in 1980. The park is named after the  mountain Pulie Badze, which means "Pulie's  Seat", named after the legendary folktale character "Pulie".

The park is home to a vast variety of birds like Tragopan Blythii, White-naped Yuhina and Dark-rumped swift. The park has various tourist amenities such as campgrounds, walking paths, etc.

References

Protected areas of Nagaland
Geography of Nagaland
Kohima district
Wildlife sanctuaries in Nagaland
1980 establishments in Nagaland